Dr. Sarra Lajnef OLY (born September 5, 1989 in Tunisia) is a 2012 Tunisian Olympic Swimmer, Rower and Triathlete.
Sarra started swimming as early as 4 years old. She then fell in love with the sport and its competitive nature. Before she turned 15, Sarra decided to leave her family, comfort, friends and move to France to pursue her dream of making it to the Olympics and continuing her studies at the same time. And from there she started her journey of self-discovery and grew to see herself accomplish her dream and beyond.

Her resilience courage and grind helped her surpass all the difficulties and falls she encountered during, both, her athlete as well as professional careers. She managed to always come back stronger and eager to do better and show everyone that she is capable of the impossible but also to make others understand that no matter what life throws at us we can overcome it if we really believe in ourselves and do what it takes.

During her career as a swimmer, Sarra, won multiple championships ranging from French Junior, Arab, Mediterranean, American and African, just to name a few. But she did not want to be defined by one sport. Between 2016 and 2018, Sarra started rowing for a UAE local club, Al Hamriya Sports and cultural club. During this short period, she won Tunisian coastal rowing championships two year in a row, UAE National champion in all categories, single, double, quad, mix double and mix quad for two seasons in a row, and qualified for the coastal rowing world championships in 2017. End of 2018, Sarra took on a new challenge and decided to give it a try in triathlon, won multiple championships, medals and trophies in the UAE, and outside.

Besides all the successes athletically, Sarra is not just an athlete. Holder of a bachelor's degree in Political Sciences and International Relations from the University of Florida, in 2013, a master's degree in International Business from the University of Wollongong Dubai, in 2017 and a Professional Doctorate in Sports Management from the European International University Paris, in 2020, Sarra leaves a positive imprint wherever she goes. During her years as an international relations officer at the UAE Swimming Federation, in 2014, she helped build and WIN the bidding file for the UAE to host the 2020 (moved to 2021 because of Corona) Swimming World Championships in Abu Dhabi and was among the team that presented it to the International Swimming Federation FINA. As a sports consultant she created multiple sports academies. She, also, supported many Arab swimmers to tap into their best potential and assisted them getting recruited by the best American universities. In 2017, she built and managed (for a year and a half) a successful company based in Dubai. Since she moved to Dubai in 2013, Sarra always wanted to have her own business and was trying to get everything aligned in order to take that step. June 2019 was the beginning of a new chapter in her career. With the help of close friends and family, She decided to get the best out of her academic, professional, athletic knowledge, experience and savoir-faire that she gathered throughout the years, as an athlete, a student, an expat, a consultant... to come up with something new, a business, an entity that will improve and support further and on a bigger scale the sports business in the MEA region and beyond.

See also
 Tunisia at the 2011 All-Africa Games

References
 https://www.sarralajnef.com/our-story/
 https://www.swimmingworldmagazine.com/news/2019-world-masters-swimming-championships-day-4-more-world-records-fall-in-gwangju/
 https://www.khaleejtimes.com/sport/cricket/shivank-sarra-honoured
 https://www.dbwc.ae/cms/article_detail_page/841

1989 births
Living people
Tunisian female swimmers
Olympic swimmers of Tunisia
Swimmers at the 2012 Summer Olympics
Swimmers at the 2013 Mediterranean Games
African Games silver medalists for Tunisia
African Games medalists in swimming
People from Tunis
Competitors at the 2011 All-Africa Games
Mediterranean Games competitors for Tunisia
20th-century Tunisian women
21st-century Tunisian women